Presidential elections were held in Nigeria on 27 February 1999.  These were the first elections since the 1993 military coup, and the first elections of the Fourth Nigerian Republic. The result was a victory for Olusegun Obasanjo of the People's Democratic Party, who defeated Olu Falae, who was running on a joint Alliance for Democracy-All People's Party ticket. Voter turnout was 52.3%.

Results

References

Nigeria
Presidential
Presidential elections in Nigeria